Herman Bjorn Dahle (March 30, 1855 – April 25, 1920) was a United States Congressman in the House of Representatives from Wisconsin.

Background
Herman Bjorn Dahle was born in the town of Perry, Dane County, Wisconsin. He received his education in the district schools of his native town and in what is now the University of Wisconsin–Madison, where he graduated in 1877. He resided at Mount Vernon, Wisconsin from 1877 to 1888 where he conducted a general mercantile business. He was also the principal owner of the Mount Horeb bank beginning in 1890.

His former home, now known as the Herman B. and Anne Marie Dahle House, is listed on the National Register of Historic Places.

Political career
Dahle was elected as a Republican for Wisconsin's 2nd congressional district for the Fifty-sixth and Fifty-seventh Congresses (March 4, 1899 – March 3, 1903), but was an unsuccessful candidate for renomination in 1902. He resumed mercantile pursuits and banking in Mount Horeb, Wisconsin, where he died in 1920. He left behind an estate worth $280,000. Dahle was buried in Mount Horeb Union Cemetery.

References

Other sources
Keyes, Elisha W. History of Dane County. Biographical And Genealogical (Madison, Wisconsin: Western Historical Association, 1906)

External links

1855 births
1920 deaths
University of Wisconsin–Madison alumni
American Lutherans
People from Mount Vernon, Wisconsin
Businesspeople from Wisconsin
Republican Party members of the United States House of Representatives from Wisconsin
American people of Norwegian descent
Burials in Wisconsin
People from Mount Horeb, Wisconsin